Deatrich Wise (born May 6, 1965) is a former American football defensive tackle who played two seasons with the BC Lions of the Canadian Football League. He was drafted by the Seattle Seahawks in the ninth round of the 1988 NFL Draft. He first enrolled at Alabama State University before transferring to Jackson State University. He was also a member of the New Orleans Saints and Tampa Bay Storm.

Early years
Wise played high school football at Evergreen High School in Evergreen, Alabama. He played on the offensive and defensive lines as well as spending time as a placekicker. He received the Defensive Lineman of the Year Award, and the Wendell Hart Memorial Trophy for Most Valuable Player in 1983.

College career
Wise first played college football for the Alabama State Hornets of Alabama State University. He transferred to play for the Jackson State Tigers of Jackson State University. The Tigers made the NCAA Division I-AA football playoffs in 1985, 1986 and 1987.

Professional career
Wise was selected by the Seattle Seahawks with the 242nd pick in the 1988 NFL Draft. He spent time with the New Orleans Saints in 1989. He played for the BC Lions from 1990 to 1991. Wise was a member of the Tampa Bay Storm from 1992 to 1995, earning First Team All-Arena honors in 1993.

Coaching career
Wise was an assistant coach for the Jackson State Tigers from 1992 to 1993, working with the offensive line, defensive line and special teams. He was an offensive and defensive line coach for the Tampa Bay Storm from 1994 to 1995.

After coaching football and track for the Birmingham Public Schools System from 1996 to 1997, Wise served as an assistant coach for the Delaware State Hornets of Delaware State University from 1997 to 1999. He was an assistant offensive and defensive line coach for the Grand Rapids Rampage from 1999 to 2000. He was head coach of the Norfolk Nighthawks of the af2 from 2000 to 2001. The Nighthawks finished with an 11-11 record under Wise.

After coaching track and field and football for the Norfolk Public Schools System from 2001 to 2003, Wise was head coach at I. C. Norcom High School in Virginia from 2004 to 2006.

He served as an assistant coach for the Dallas Desperados from 2007 to 2008. He became the head coach at Coppell Middle School West in 2014.

Personal life
His oldest son, Deatrich Jr., was a fourth-round pick of the New England Patriots in 2017. His youngest son, Daniel, plays for the Washington Football Team.

References

External links
 Just Sports Stats

Living people
1965 births
American football defensive tackles
Canadian football defensive linemen
Af2 coaches
Alabama State Hornets football players
BC Lions players
Dallas Desperados coaches
Delaware State Hornets football coaches
Grand Rapids Rampage coaches
Jackson State Tigers football coaches
Jackson State Tigers football players
Tampa Bay Storm coaches
Tampa Bay Storm players
High school football coaches in Virginia
People from Evergreen, Alabama
Players of American football from Alabama
African-American coaches of American football
African-American players of American football
African-American players of Canadian football
21st-century African-American people
20th-century African-American sportspeople